Sásd is a town in Baranya county, Hungary. The total population of Sásd in 2015 was 3094.

Twin towns – sister cities
Sásd is twinned with:
  Westhausen, Germany
  Izvoru Crișului, Romania
  Raaba, Austria
  Supino, Italy
  Pierrelaye, France 
  Neftenbach, Switzerland
  Mogilany, Poland

References

External links

  in Hungarian

Populated places in Baranya County
Baranya (region)
History of Baranya (region)